Cortright is a surname of Flemish origin, an English variation is Cartwright. Notable people with the surname include:

 Elizabeth Monroe Kortright, First lady, wife of President James Monroe 5th President of U.S.
 David Cortright, American peace activist
 Edgar Cortright (b. 1923), American scientist and engineer
 Ion Cortright (1889 - 1961), American football player and coach
 Petra Cortright (b. 1986), American Internet artist
 Richard Cortright (1929 - 2009), American cyclist
 Stephen Cortright (b. 1941), American military officer and attorney

Less commonly, Cortright is used as a given name.
 Cortright McMeel (1971 - 2013), American novelist

English-language surnames